Hilduin III (died after 1032), Count of Montdidier, Seigneur de Ramerupt, son of Hilduin II, Count of Arcis-sur-Aube.  He was a member of the House of Montdidier.  Virtually nothing is known about his life.

Hilduin married Lessaline de Dammartin, although, when widowed, she apparently married Renaud I, Count of Soissons as her second husband.  Hilduin and his wife had three children:
 Hilduin IV, Count of Montdidier
 Manasses de Ramerupt 
 Guilliume.

Upon his death, Hilduin III was succeeded by his son Hilduin IV as Count of Montdidier.

Sources 
Tardif, J., Monuments historiques, Paris, 1866

Morton, Catherine, and Muntz, Hope (editors). The Carmen de Hastingae Proelio of Bishop Guy of Amiens, Oxford at the Clarendon Press, 1972

Medieval Lands Project, Seigneurs de Ramerupt, Comtes de Montdidier, Comtes d’Arcis-sur-Aube

Counts of Montdidier
11th-century deaths